Amphetamine Reptile Records is an American record label founded in 1986 by American musician Tom Hazelmyer.

List of releases

United States Discography

Singles Discography

References

General

Specific

External links
Amphetamine Reptile Records at Discogs

Discographies of American record labels